This is a partial list of Pakistanis named in the Pandora Papers as shareholders, directors and beneficiaries of offshore companies. In total 700 Pakistanis are named in Pandora Papers, including politicians, businessmen and military officers.

Politicians

Ministers 
 Shaukat Tarin, Finance Minister of Pakistan
 Moonis Elahi, Minister for Water Resources
 Raja Nadir Pervez, Former Minister for Interior of Pakistan

Legislators 
 Sharjeel Memon, former member of the Provincial Assembly of Sindh from June 2008 to May 2018
 Chaudhry Moonis Elahi, Member of the National Assembly of Pakistan
 Aleem Khan, Senior Minister of Punjab and Minister of Food, Member of the Provincial Assembly of the Punjab
 Faisal Vawda, member of the Senate of Pakistan, former member of the National Assembly and former Minister for Water Resources

kith and kin 
 Abdullah Masood Khan, son of PM’s former adviser for finance and revenue Waqar Masood Khan
 Ali Dar, son of PML-N’s Ishaq Dar
 Arif Naqvi, friend of Imran Khan and PTI donor
 Tariq Shafi, friend of Imran Khan and PTI donor
 Yawar Salman, son of former FBR chairman and finance secretary Salman Siddiq
 Family of Minister for Industries and Production Khusro Bakhtiar
 Wife of PML-Q's Chaudhry Pervez Elahi

Media 
 Arif Nizami, journalist and editor of Pakistan Today
 Hameed Haroon, CEO of Dawn Media Group
 Mir Shakilur Rehman, editor-in-chief of Jang Media Group
 Sultan Ali Lakhani, CEO of Express Media Group
 Gourmet Group, which owns the GNN TV channel

Military 
 Ahad and Umar Khattak, sons of former Pakistan Air Force chief Abbas Khattak
 Ahsan Latif, son-in-law of retired Lt Gen Khalid Maqbool
 Raja Nadir Pervez, retired army officer and former minister
 Retired Maj Gen Nusrat Naeem, former ISI director general of counterintelligence
 Retired Lt Gen Habibullah Khan Khattak's daughter Shahnaz Sajjad Ahmad (also the sister of retired Lt Gen Ali Kuli Khan and sister-in-law of former federal minister Gohar Ayub Khan)
 Retired Lt Gen Muhammad Afzal Muzaffar’s son Muhammad Hasan Muzaffar
 Zahra Tanvir, wife of retired Lt Gen Tanvir Tahir’s wife
 Wife of retired Lt Gen Shafaat Ullah Shah



Businessperson 
 Shoaib Ahmed Sheikh, CEO of the Axact
 Adnan Afridi, managing director of the National Investment Trust
 Arif Usmani, president of the National Bank of Pakistan
 Javed Afridi, CEO of Haier Pakistan and owner of Peshawar Zalmi

References 

Pandora Papers

 
Pandora